Salvia aurita (African blue sage) is a herbaceous perennial shrub native to South Africa (the Cape Provinces, KwaZulu-Natal and the Northern Provinces) and Eswatini. It is found growing on streambanks.

Notes

aurita
Flora of the Cape Provinces
Flora of KwaZulu-Natal
Flora of Swaziland
Flora of the Northern Provinces